Svetlana Stupina (born 31 October 2001) is a Kazakhstani footballer who plays as a forward for Zhas Kyran and the Kazakhstan women's national team.

Club career
Stupina has played for Zhas Kyran in Kazakhstan.

International career
Stupina capped for Kazakhstan at senior level during the UEFA Women's Euro 2022 qualifying.

References

2001 births
Living people
Kazakhstani women's footballers
Women's association football forwards
Kazakhstan women's international footballers